Short-circuit evaluation, minimal evaluation, or McCarthy evaluation (after John McCarthy) is the semantics of some Boolean operators in some programming languages in which the second argument is executed or evaluated only if the first argument does not suffice to determine the value of the expression: when the first argument of the AND function evaluates to false, the overall value must be false; and when the first argument of the OR function evaluates to true, the overall value must be true.

In programming languages with lazy evaluation (Lisp, Perl, Haskell), the usual Boolean operators are short-circuit.  In others (Ada, Java, Delphi), both short-circuit and standard Boolean operators are available. For some Boolean operations, like exclusive or (XOR), it is not possible to short-circuit, because both operands are always required to determine the result.

Short-circuit operators are, in effect, control structures rather than simple arithmetic operators, as they are not strict. In imperative language terms (notably C and C++), where side effects are important, short-circuit operators introduce a sequence point – they completely evaluate the first argument, including any side effects, before (optionally) processing the second argument. ALGOL 68 used proceduring to achieve user-defined short-circuit operators and procedures.

The use of short-circuit operators has been criticized as problematic:

Definition 
In any programming language that implements short-circuit evaluation, the expression x and y is equivalent to the conditional expression if x then y else x, and the expression x or y is equivalent to if x then x else y. In either case, x is only evaluated once.

The generalized definition above accommodates loosely typed languages that have more than the two truth-values True and False, where short-circuit operators may return the last evaluated subexpression. This is called "last value" in the table below. For a strictly-typed language, the expression is simplified to if x then y else false and if x then true else y respectively for the boolean case.

Precedence 
An example of the two operator taking the same precedence and being left-associative with each other is POSIX shell's command-list syntax.

 function short-circuit-eval (operators, values)
     let result := True
     for each (op, val) in (operators, values):
         if op = "AND" && result = False
             continue
         else if op = "OR" && result = True
             return result
         else
             result := val
     return result

Formalization 
Short-circuit logic, with or without side-effects, have been formalized based on Hoare's conditional. A result is that non-short-circuiting operators can be defined out of short-circuit logic to have the same sequence of evaluation.

Support in common programming and scripting languages

1 ABAP and APL have no distinct boolean type.
2 When overloaded, the operators && and || are eager and can return any type.
3 This only applies to runtime-evaluated expressions, static if and static assert. Expressions in static initializers or manifest constants use eager evaluation.
4 Fortran operators are neither short-circuit nor eager: the language specification allows the compiler to select the method for optimization.
5 ISO/IEC 10206:1990 Extended Pascal allows, but does not require, short-circuiting.
6 ISO/IEC 10206:1990 Extended Pascal supports and_then and or_else.
7 Smalltalk uses short-circuit semantics as long as the argument to and: is a block (e.g., false and: [Transcript show: 'Wont see me']).
8 BASIC languages that supported CASE statements did so by using the conditional evaluation system, rather than as jump tables limited to fixed labels.
9 Delphi and Free Pascal default to short circuit evaluation. This may be changed by compiler options but does not seem to be used widely.
10 The norm IEC 61131-3 doesn't actually define if AND and OR use short-circuit evaluation and it doesn't define the operators AND_THEN and OR_ELSE. The entries in the table show how it works for Beckhoff TwinCAT®.

Common use

Avoiding undesired side effects of the second argument
Usual example, using a C-based language:
int denom = 0;
if (denom != 0 && num / denom)
{
    ... // ensures that calculating num/denom never results in divide-by-zero error   
}

Consider the following example:
int a = 0;
if (a != 0 && myfunc(b))
{
    do_something();
}

In this example, short-circuit evaluation guarantees that myfunc(b) is never called. This is because a != 0 evaluates to false.  This feature permits two useful programming constructs.

  If the first sub-expression checks whether an expensive computation is needed and the check evaluates to false, one can eliminate expensive computation in the second argument. 
 It permits a construct where the first expression guarantees a condition without which the second expression may cause a run-time error.

Both are illustrated in the following C snippet where minimal evaluation prevents both null pointer dereference and excess memory fetches:
bool is_first_char_valid_alpha_unsafe(const char *p)
{
    return isalpha(p[0]); // SEGFAULT highly possible with p == NULL
}

bool is_first_char_valid_alpha(const char *p)
{
    return p != NULL && isalpha(p[0]); // 1) no unneeded isalpha() execution with p == NULL, 2) no SEGFAULT risk
}

Idiomatic conditional construct

Since minimal evaluation is part of an operator's semantic definition and not an optional optimization, a number of coding idioms rely on it as a succinct conditional construct. Examples include:

Perl idioms:
some_condition or die;    # Abort execution if some_condition is false
some_condition and die;   # Abort execution if some_condition is true

POSIX shell idioms:
modprobe -q some_module && echo "some_module installed" || echo "some_module not installed"
This idiom presumes that echo cannot fail.

Possible problems

Untested second condition leads to unperformed side effect 
Despite these benefits, minimal evaluation may cause problems for programmers who do not realize (or forget) it is happening. For example, in the code
if (expressionA && myfunc(b)) {
    do_something();
}
if myfunc(b) is supposed to perform some required operation regardless of whether do_something() is executed, such as allocating system resources, and expressionA evaluates as false, then myfunc(b) will not execute, which could cause problems. Some programming languages, such as Java, have two operators, one that employs minimal evaluation and one that does not, to avoid this problem.

Problems with unperformed side effect statements can be easily solved with proper programming style, i.e., not using side effects in boolean statements, as using values with side effects in evaluations tends to generally make the code opaque and error-prone.

Reduced efficiency due to constraining optimizations

Short-circuiting can lead to errors in branch prediction on modern central processing units (CPUs), and dramatically reduce performance. A notable example is highly optimized ray with axis aligned box intersection code in ray tracing. Some compilers can detect such cases and emit faster code, but programming language semantics may constrain such optimizations.

An example of a compiler unable to optimize for such a case is Java's Hotspot VM as of 2012.

See also
Don't-care condition

References

Articles with example C code
Articles with example Perl code
Compiler optimizations
Conditional constructs
Evaluation strategy
Implementation of functional programming languages